Bordj Zemmoura District is a district of Bordj Bou Arréridj Province, Algeria.

Municipalities
The district is further divided into 3 municipalities:
Bordj Zemoura
Ouled Dahmane 
Tassamert

Districts of Bordj Bou Arréridj Province